Rainer Vassiljev (born July 19, 1983) is an Estonian professional volleyball coach. He is an assistant coach of the Estonia women's national volleyball team. On club level he is the current head coach of Pafiakos of the Cyprus Volleyball Division 1.

References

1983 births
Living people
Volleyball coaches of international teams
Estonian volleyball coaches
Sportspeople from Rakvere
Gwardia Wrocław coaches
21st-century Estonian people